Gavork may refer to:
Gavork-e Nalin Rural District
Gavork-e Sardasht Rural District